Salisbury Township is one of fourteen townships in Rowan County, North Carolina, United States. The township had a population of 28,594 according to the 2000 census and is currently the most populous township in Rowan County.

Geographically, Salisbury Township occupies  in central Rowan County.  Large portions of the city of Salisbury, the county seat of Rowan County are located in the township.  In addition, the towns of Spencer, East Spencer, and a small portion of the town Granite Quarry are located in Salisbury Township.  The township's northern border is formed by the Yadkin River.

Townships in Rowan County, North Carolina
Townships in North Carolina